Almandin (foaled 27 March 2010) is a Thoroughbred racehorse bred in Germany and trained in Germany and Australia.

He was the winner of the 2016 Melbourne Cup, ridden by Kerrin McEvoy and trained by Robert Hickmott.

Background
He was sired by Monsun, who also sired the 2013 Melbourne Cup winner, Fiorente, and the 2014 Melbourne Cup winner, Protectionist. Almandin's dam Anatola was a half-sister to the German Oaks winner Amarette.

Racing career
In his first two seasons, Almandin was trained in Europe by Wilhelm Giedt and then Jean-Pierre Carvalho and raced in France and Germany. On 1 June 2014 he recorded his biggest victory in Europe when he won the Group Two Grosser Preis der Badischen Unternehmen over 2000 metres, beating Protectionist by three quarters of a length.  He then had a lengthy spell due to an issue with a tendon.

In 2016, Almandin began racing in Australia, in the colours of Lloyd Williams and trained by Robert Hickmott.  Williams syndicated the gelding with music promoter Michael Gudinski, Sydney businessman and thoroughbred owner John Ingham, Quiksilver founder Alan Green, Rip Curl co-founder Brian Singer and construction industry figures Vin Sammartino and Phil Mehrten.

In his first Australian run, over 1600 metres in June 2016, Almandin finished sixth; he then recorded two further unplaced finishes.  On 24 September 2016, he won the Listed Harry White Classic over 2400 metres at Caulfield Racecourse beating his stablemate Assign by two lengths. Eight days later, he was moved up in class and distance for the Group 3 Bart Cummings over 2500 metres at Flemington. Ridden as in his previous start by Damien Oliver he started favourite and won by one and a half lengths from Zanteca.

On 1 November 2016, Almandin started at odds of around 10/1 for the Melbourne Cup at Flemington. Ridden by Kerrin McEvoy, he engaged in a stirring duel with the Irish challenger Heartbreak City for most of the straight, before taking the lead and winning in the final strides.

Pedigree

References

Melbourne Cup winners
Thoroughbred family 2-n
2010 racehorse births
Racehorses bred in Germany
Racehorses trained in Germany
Racehorses trained in Australia
Individual male horses